The Tea Area School District is a public school district in Lincoln County, based in Tea, South Dakota.

Schools
The Tea Area School District has three elementary schools, one middle school, one high school and a district education center.

Elementary schools
Tea Area Frontier Elementary School
Tea Area Legacy Elementary School
Tea Area Venture Elementary

Middle school
Tea Area Middle School

High school
Tea Area High School

References

External links

School districts in South Dakota
Education in Lincoln County, South Dakota
School districts established in 2003